This article lists political parties in Panama.

Panama has a multi-party system.   Although there are three major political parties, no one party often has a chance of gaining power alone, and parties must work with each other to form coalition governments.

Parties with less than 30,000 members are not recognized by the Tribunal Electoral, and as a result, they are not able to participate in Panama's general elections.

The parties

Parliamentary parties
The following are parliamentary parties.

Other Parties
People's Party
Civic Renewal Party
Communist Party of Panama
Moral Vanguard of the Fatherland
People's Party of Panama
MLN-29
Socialist Workers Front
Workers Party (Marxist–Leninist)
Broad Front for Democracy
Independent Social Alternative Party
Realizing Goals

See also
 Politics of Panama
 Liberalism in Panama

References 

Panama
 
Political parties in Panama
Panama
Political parties